Přešťovice is a municipality and village in Strakonice District in the South Bohemian Region of the Czech Republic. It has about 500 inhabitants.

Administrative parts
Villages of Brusy and Kbelnice are administrative parts of Přešťovice.

References

Villages in Strakonice District